William Radley Longbottom (born 12 December 1998) is an English footballer who plays as a forward for National League North club Bradford (Park Avenue).

Career
Longbottom made his first team debut for Doncaster Rovers on 8 May 2016, coming on as a second-half substitute for Richard Chaplow in a home League One match against Burton Albion at the Keepmoat Stadium. He scored his first goal for Doncaster in an EFL Trophy tie against Derby County Under-23s on 4 October 2016.

On 27 January 2018 it was reported that Longbottom had been given a new contract with Rovers up to the summer of 2020.

On 1 September 2018, Longbottom went out on a month's loan to National League North club Kidderminster Harriers. He made 5 appearances, scoring one goal and made one assist before an ankle injury forced his return.

He was loaned out to Halesowen Town of the Northern Premier League on 9 February.

Longbottom went out on an initial one-month loan to Gainsborough Trinity on 25 January 2019.

He was transfer-listed by Doncaster at the end of the 2018–19 season though remained with the club until being released on 31 January 2020.

Career statistics

Club
Missing loan spells

References

External links

1998 births
Living people
Footballers from Leeds
English footballers
English expatriate sportspeople
English Football League players
League of Ireland players
Association football forwards
Doncaster Rovers F.C. players
Kidderminster Harriers F.C. players
Halesowen Town F.C. players
Gainsborough Trinity F.C. players
Waterford F.C. players
Bradford (Park Avenue) A.F.C. players
Expatriate association footballers in the Republic of Ireland
English expatriate sportspeople in Ireland